Top Country Albums is a chart that ranks the top-performing country music albums in the United States, published by Billboard.  In 2009, 16 different albums topped the chart; placings were based on electronic point of sale data from retail outlets.

Unusually, the year began and ended with the same album at number one.  In the issue of Billboard dated January 3, 19-year-old singer Taylor Swift's album Fearless spent its sixth week in the top spot.  The album held the top spot for 13 of the first 14 weeks of 2009.  Later in the year, the album experienced a resurgence in its chart performance, returning to number one in the issue dated August 1.  It returned to the top spot periodically for the remainder of the year, and in the issue dated December 26 spent its 29th week atop the chart.  The album also topped the all-genre Billboard 200 for 11 weeks, and won a number of awards, including the Grammy Awards for Album of the Year and Best Country Album.  It was 2009's biggest-selling album in the U.S. and would eventually be certified diamond by the Recording Industry Association of America for shipping more than 10 million units.

After Fearless, the album which spent the most time at number one on the Top Country Albums chart in 2009 was the soundtrack album of the film Hannah Montana: The Movie, starring 16-year-old actress/singer Miley Cyrus, who performed most of the tracks.  The album spent nine non-consecutive weeks atop the chart, interrupted for a single week by Kenny Chesney's Greatest Hits II.  In contrast to teen stars Swift and Cyrus, George Strait topped the chart at the age of 57 with Twang.  It was the 23rd number one for the singer, who had first reached the peak position with Right or Wrong more than 25 years earlier and achieved regular chart-toppers ever since.  Strait's album was displaced from number one by Keep On Loving You by Reba McEntire, another veteran country star who had been achieving chart-toppers since the 1980s.  It was the 11th number one for McEntire, breaking the record for the most chart-topping country albums by a female artist which she had previously shared with Loretta Lynn.

Chart history

References

2009
United States Country Albums